Dalibor Čutura (born 14 June 1975) is a Serbian handball coach and former player.

Club career
Over the course of his career that spanned more than 25 years, Čutura played for Crvenka, Sintelon, Železničar Niš (1997–1998), Fotex Veszprém (1998–1999), Lovćen (1999–2001), Pilotes Posada (2001–2002), Alcobendas (2002–2003), Arrate (2003–2010), Ademar León (2010–2012), HCM Constanța (2012–2015), and Dobrogea Sud Constanța (2015–2019).

International career
At international level, Čutura represented Serbia at the 2012 European Championship, winning the silver medal. He also participated in the 2012 Summer Olympics.

Personal life
Čutura is the older brother of fellow handball player Davor Čutura.

Honours
Lovćen
 Handball Championship of FR Yugoslavia: 1999–2000, 2000–01
HCM Constanța
 Liga Națională: 2012–13, 2013–14
 Cupa României: 2012–13, 2013–14
 Supercupa României: 2013, 2014
Dobrogea Sud Constanța
 Cupa României: 2017–18
 Supercupa României: 2017

References

External links

 Olympic record
 
 

1975 births
Living people
Sportspeople from Sombor
Serbian male handball players
Olympic handball players of Serbia
Handball players at the 2012 Summer Olympics
RK Crvenka players
RK Sintelon players
Veszprém KC players
CB Ademar León players
HC Dobrogea Sud Constanța players
Liga ASOBAL players
Expatriate handball players
Serbian expatriate sportspeople in Hungary
Serbian expatriate sportspeople in Spain
Serbian expatriate sportspeople in Romania
Serbian handball coaches